WEAM-FM (100.7 FM) is a Christian radio station licensed to serve Buena Vista, Georgia, United States.  The station is currently owned by Davis Broadcasting. It airs a Gospel music format.  Its studios are co-located with four other sister stations on Wynnton Road in Columbus east of downtown, and its transmitter is located in Cusetta, Georgia.

The station was assigned the WEAM-FM call letters by the Federal Communications Commission on April 28, 2003.

References

External links

Gospel radio stations in the United States
Marion County, Georgia
Radio stations established in 2003
EAM-FM